Isabel Madeleine Quigly FRSL (17 September 1926 – 14 September 2018) was a writer, translator and film critic.

Biography
She was born in Ontaneda, Spain, and educated at Godolphin School, Salisbury and Newnham College, Cambridge. In her early career, she worked for Penguin Books and Red Cross Geneva. Between 1956 and 1966, she was film critic of The Spectator. She served as literary editor of The Tablet from 1985 to 1997. She also contributed to numerous journals and newspapers, and served on the jury of various literary prizes including the Booker Prize jury in 1986.

In 1953, her first book, and only novel, The Eye of Heaven, was published. Other books include The Heirs of Tom Brown: The English School Story and Charlie Chaplin: Early Comedies. She has also translated more than 100 books from Italian, Spanish and French. Her most notable translations are Silvano Ceccherini's The Transfer, for which, in 1967, she won the John Florio Prize, and Giorgio Bassani's The Garden of the Finzi-Continis. According to Robin Healey's Twentieth-Century Italian Literature in English Translation, Quigly was one of the top 10 translators of Italian literature of the last 70 years, alongside Archibald Colquhoun, Patrick Creagh, Angus Davidson, Frances Frenaye, Stuart Hood, Eric Mosbacher, Raymond Rosenthal, Bernard Wall and William Weaver.

Quigly died in Haywards Heath in 2018.

Selected translations
 Silvano Ceccherini: The Transfer (John Florio Prize)
 Giorgio Bassani: The Garden of the Finzi-Continis
 Giorgio Bassani: A Prospect of Ferrara 
 Giorgio Bassani: The Gold-Rimmed Spectacles
 Alba de Céspedes: Between Then and Now 
 Alba de Céspedes: La Bambolona 
 Alba de Céspedes: The Secret
 Antonio Cossu: The Sardinian Hostage
 Attilio Veraldi: The Payoff 
 Carlo Cassola: Fausto and Anna 
 Carlo Monterosso: The Salt of the Earth
 Carlo Picchio: Freedom Fighter
 Elena Bono: The Widow of Pilate
 Elsa Morante: Arturo's Island 
 Ercole Patti: That Wonderful November
 Fabio Carpi: The Abandoned Places 
 Fausta Cialente: The Levantines 
 Fortunato Seminara: The Wind in the Olive Grove
 Giuliana Pandolfi Boldrini: The Etruscan Leopards
 Giuseppe Dessì: The House at San Silvano 
 Goffredo Parise: Solitudes 
 Livia Svevo: Memoir of Italo Svevo
 Lorenza Mazzetti: Rage 
 Luigi Magnani: Beethoven's Nephew
 Luigi Preti: Through the Fascist Fire 
 Michele Prisco: A Spiral of Mist
 Nino Palumbo: The Bribe
 Nino Palumbo: Tomorrow Will be Better
 Oliviero Honore Bianchi: Devil's Night
 Oriana Fallaci: Nothing, and So Be It
 Renato Ghiotto: The Slave
 Sergio Donati: The Paper Tomb
 Uberto Paolo Quintavalle: On the Make
 Georges Simenon: The Family Lie

References

1926 births
2018 deaths
Fellows of the Royal Society of Literature
20th-century British translators
Italian–English translators
People educated at Godolphin School
Alumni of Newnham College, Cambridge
British women writers
20th-century women writers